Leibig is an unincorporated community in southwestern Ripley County, in the U.S. state of Missouri. The community is located approximately eight miles southwest of Doniphan and three miles north of the Missouri-Arkansas border. The Fourche River is just west of the village.

History
A variant spelling was "Liebig". A post office called Liebig was established in 1905, and remained in operation until 1931. The community has the name of John Liebig, a pioneer settler.

References

Unincorporated communities in Ripley County, Missouri
Unincorporated communities in Missouri